Azad, Azerbaijan may refer to:
 Azad, Goranboy
 Azad, Goygol